Frédéric Jean is a Swiss curler and curling coach.

Teams

Record as a coach of national teams

References

External links
 
 
 Du suchst einen Curling Coach - Rent a Curling Coach 
 Ein Olympiasieger erinnert sich | Bieler Tagblatt 
 Video: 

Living people
Swiss male curlers
World curling champions
Swiss curling champions
Swiss curling coaches
Year of birth missing (living people)